Hans Bitterlich (28 April 1860, Vienna - 5 August 1949, Vienna) was an Austrian sculptor.

Life and work 
His father was the sculptor and history painter, Eduard Bitterlich. He studied with Edmund von Hellmer and Kaspar von Zumbusch, and was a professor at the Academy of Fine Arts, Vienna, from 1901 to 1931. 

His best known works include a monument to Gutenberg in the  district (1900), and the monument to Empress Elisabeth in the Volksgarten, both with an architectural framework by Friedrich Ohmann. 

In 1943, he was awarded the Goethe-Medaille für Kunst und Wissenschaft, and placed on the Gottbegnadeten list of Joseph Goebbels, as an important artist of the Nazi state.

References

Further reading 
 "Hans Bitterlich" @ University of Vienna, Monuments

External links 

 
 Hedwig Abraham (Ed.): "Ehrengrab von Vater und Sohn Bitterlich auf dem Wiener Zentralfriedhof" @ Viennatouristguide

1860 births
1949 deaths
Austrian sculptors
Academic staff of the Academy of Fine Arts Vienna
Artists from Vienna